The Asia Society is a 501(c) organization that focuses on educating the world about Asia. It has several centers in the United States (Manhattan, Washington, D.C., Houston, Los Angeles, and San Francisco) and around the world (Hong Kong, Manila, Mumbai, Seoul, Shanghai, Melbourne, and Zurich). These centers are overseen by the Society's headquarters in New York City, which includes a museum that exhibits the Rockefeller collection of Asian art and rotating exhibits with pieces from many countries in Asia and Oceania.

In January 2021, the Asia Society named former Australian Prime Minister Kevin Rudd as its CEO and President.

Mission

The Asia Society defines the region of Asia as the area from Japan to Iran, from central Asia to Australia, New Zealand and the Pacific Islands.  The Asia Society is a nonprofit, non-partisan organization whose aim is to build awareness about Asian politics, business, education, arts, and culture through education. The organization sponsors the exhibitions of art, performance, film, lectures, and programs for students and teachers. The programs are aimed at increasing knowledge of society with a focus on human rights, environment, global health and the position of women.

The Asia Society's original focus was explaining aspects about Asia to Americans, and Robin Pogrebin of The New York Times said that it was "[l]ong regarded as a New York institution with regional branches". Around 2011 the society was refocusing efforts on augmenting partnerships amongst Asians and between Asians and Americans in business, culture, education, and public policy. In 2011 Pogrebin said "over the last few years [it] has aimed to recast itself as an international organization, partly through the construction of the two major centers in cities where it previously had only offices".

History
The Asia Society was founded in 1956 by John D. Rockefeller III. Initially established to promote greater knowledge of Asia in the US, today the Society is a global institution—with offices throughout the US and Asia—that fulfills its educational mandate through a wide range of cross-disciplinary programming. As economies and cultures have become more interconnected, the Society's programs have expanded to address Asian American issues, the effects of globalization, and pressing concerns in Asia including human rights, the status of women, and environmental and global health issues such as HIV/AIDS. The organization's records are held at the Rockefeller Archive Center in North Tarrytown, NY.

Buildings

Headquarters
The Society's Manhattan headquarters, at Park Avenue and East 70th Street on the Upper East Side, is a nine-story building faced in smooth red Oklahoma granite designed by Edward Larrabee Barnes / John M.Y. Lee Architects in 1980. Since it replaced some old brownstones on one of the city's most prestigious streets, Barnes gave the building a strong facade to continue the line along Park, and set it back from East 70th with a terraced garden buffering it between the street and the older houses on that block. The semicircular window on the upper story and variations in the color and finish of the granite are intended to evoke Asian cultures. Paul Goldberger, architecture critic at The New York Times, called it "an ambitious building, full of civilized intentions, some of which succeed and others that do not". In the former category he put the interiors and the overall shape; in the latter he included the facade.

In 1999, it was closed for 18 months so that new interiors, designed by Bartholomew Voorsanger, could be built. During that time the society used the former Christie's Manhattan offices on 59th Street as a temporary home. The completed renovation included a  atrium and cafe. The expansion doubled the museum's exhibition space, allowing the society to put the entire Rockefeller Asian art collection on display.

Robin Pogrebin of The New York Times said in 2011 that the Asia Society is "perhaps best known for the elegance of its headquarters and galleries on Park Avenue at 70th Street".

Global centers

Along with its New York headquarters, the Asia Society has centers throughout the United States and Asia. 2012 marked a major expansion, with the opening of multimillion-dollar buildings in Hong Kong and Houston, Texas. The Hong Kong complex, dedicated on February 9, 2012, is situated on the site of a former British military explosives magazine overlooking Victoria Harbour and includes numerous restored military buildings. The project was designed by architects Tod Williams and Billie Tsien. The Houston building, located in the city's museum district, opened on May 6, 2012 and was designed by architect Yoshio Taniguchi. The other American centers are located in San Francisco, Los Angeles and Washington, D.C.  Other Asian centers are in Seoul, Manila, Shanghai and Mumbai. There is also a center located in Melbourne, Australia.

Houston

The Texas Center first opened in 1979. The current  building, with a cost of $50 million, has a modernist style and was built with German-origin Jura limestone personally inspected by Taniguchi and his employees. The building includes glass walls, steam generated from the roofline, and a garden as significant elements.

Museum 
At its 70th Street headquarters, The Asia Society Museum is host to both traditional and contemporary exhibitions, film screenings, literature, performing, and visual arts. The holdings include works from more than thirty Asian-Pacific countries including Hindu and Buddhist statuary, temple carvings, Chinese ceramics and paintings, Japanese art, and contemporary art. The museum's collection of traditional objects stems from a donation from Asia Society founder John D. Rockefeller III and Blanchette Ferry Hooker Rockefeller, who contributed a number of items in 1978. The society began actively collecting contemporary Asian art with a 2007 initiative. A major renovation was completed in 2001, doubling the size of the four public galleries and expanding space for educational programming.

The headquarters also houses a museum shop and café. Forbes has listed the Garden Court Cafe on its All-Star Eateries in New York list several times.

Leadership 
On May 21, 2013, Asia Society announced that World Economic Forum Vice Chair Josette Sheeran, a former Executive Director of the United Nations World Food Programme (WFP), would on June 10, 2013 become the seventh president and CEO of the institution. Dan Washburn is the Chief Content Officer. In January 2021, Kevin Rudd, a former Prime Minister of Australia, became President and CEO of the institution, succeeding Sheeran.

Board Co-Chairs
Ronnie Chan
Henrietta H. Fore

Presidents
Phillips Talbot 1970–1982
Robert Oxnam 1982–1992
Vishakha N. Desai 2004–2012
Josette Sheeran, 2013–2021
Kevin Rudd, 2021–present

Functions

Business
The Asia Society annually presents a Corporate Conference in Asia, which functions as a fundraiser, to examine the implications of macroeconomic trends and geopolitical developments for the region and the world. Heads of Asian governments are often featured, as well as roundtable discussions with business and policy leaders from around the world.

Education
The Asia Society's Education department has two primary objectives: one focusing on teaching and learning about Asia in the United States and the other on the expansion of US investments in international studies at the elementary and secondary school levels.

International education generally encompasses the knowledge of other world regions, cultures and global issues; skills in communicating in languages other than English, working in global or cross-cultural environments and using information from different sources around the world; and values of respect and concern for other cultures and peoples.

International Studies Schools Network
The Asia Society International Studies Schools Network (ISSN) comprises a select group of public elementary and secondary schools across the country with programs in "developing globally competent, college-ready high school students". There are currently 35 schools in the network, covering both rural and urban communities and in cities throughout the U.S., from the Henry Street School for International Studies (New York, NY) and the Academy of International Studies (Charlotte, NC) to the Denver Center for International Studies (Denver, CO) to Vaughn International Studies Academy (San Fernando, CA) and the International Studies Learning Center (Los Angeles, CA).

Policy
The Asia Society houses two policy institutions. The Asia Society Policy Institute (ASPI), founded in 1956, is a think-and-do tank designed to bring about changes that incorporate the best ideas from top experts in Asia and to work with policy makers to integrate these ideas and put them into practice.

The Center on U.S.-China Relations was established in 2006 with a gift from Arthur Ross with the goal of helping to forge a more constructive bilateral relationship. The Center undertakes projects and events which explore areas of common interest and divergent views between the two countries, focusing on policy, culture, business, media, economics, energy and the environment. Orville Schell is the current Director of the Center.

Partnerships
In May 2020, during the COVID-19 pandemic, the Asia Society partnered with the nonprofit organization East Coast Coalition for Tolerance and Non-Discrimination and the Rockefeller Foundation to host a virtual forum entitled Standing Against Racism in the Time of COVID. Speakers at the forum included Representative Ted Lieu, Los Angeles Mayor Eric Garcetti, community organizer Bincheng Mao, and actor Tzi Ma.

Controversy

Blocking pro-democracy activist from attending event
Pro-democracy activist and secretary-general of Demosisto Joshua Wong was allegedly disallowed by Asia Society Hong Kong from speaking at a book launch originally scheduled to take place at its Hong Kong venue on June 28, 2017. It was understood that Asia Society Hong Kong was approached by PEN Hong Kong to co-curate the book launch, but negotiations stalled upon the former's request for a more diverse panel of speakers.  PEN Hong Kong, a nonprofit organization supporting literature and freedom of expression, eventually decided to relocate the launch of Hong Kong 20/20: Reflections on a Borrowed Place – of which Wong was one of the authors – to the Foreign Correspondents Club. Joshua Wong says that Asia Society Hong Kong needs to give a “reasonable explanation” for the incident.

“The mission of PEN Hong Kong is to promote literature and defend the freedom of expression. To bar one of the contributors to our anthology, whether it is Joshua Wong or somebody else, from speaking at our launch event would undermine and in fact contravene that mission,” said PEN Hong Kong President Jason Y. Ng.

Back to November 2016, Asia Society Hong Kong also canceled a scheduled screening of Raise The Umbrellas, a documentary on the 2014 Occupy protests with appearance of Joshua Wong.  Asia Society Hong Kong has similarly cited the lack of balanced speaker representation at the pre-screening talk as the reason for not screening the film.

US Congressman Chris Smith, co-chairperson of the Congressional-Executive Commission on China, expressed that “The Asia Society has some explaining to do after two events that featured Joshua Wong prominently were canceled over the past nine months,” said the New Jersey representative. “I commend PEN Hong Kong for not appeasing the Asia Society’s demands.”

On July 7, 2017, Asia Society Hong Kong released a statement on PEN Hong Kong's book launch event and acknowledged for their mistakes. “Asia Society takes this issue very seriously, and after looking into the circumstances, it is clear that an error in judgment at the staff level was made involving the PEN Hong Kong event. Asia Society, throughout its history, has hosted events at all of its global locations with speakers representing all sides of major Asia-related issues.” Asia Society Hong Kong emphasized they received no representations from the Chinese government on this matter, and Joshua Wong and speakers from all sides of the issue are welcome at Asia Society.

In an email to a member, Asia Society Hong Kong's Executive Director S. Alice Mong reasserted that as an independent non-government organization, it remains impartial and apolitical, and that is priority is to stay focused as an educational organization that presents balanced perspectives to promote critical understanding of topics that matter to Hong Kong, Asia and their respective roles in the global context.

On July 10, 2017, Forbes magazine ran an article revealing Hong Kong real estate magnate and Asia Society Co-chair Ronnie Chan (a US citizen) to be the political force behind the Joshua Wong incident. It alleged that wealthy Asians have been behind US think tanks and NGOs and effectively turning them into foreign policy tools of the People's Republic of China (Beijing). However, the link to the article went dead a day later. It has been rumored that Asia Society or Ronnie Chan could be taking legal action against Forbes for libel. The original Forbes article is still accessible, at a different site: http://www.intellasia.net/chinese-influence-at-the-asia-society-elitism-and-radicalisation-in-hk-607591 .

On July 20, 2017, Asia Society Chairman Ronnie Chan defended the Hong Kong center's apolitical stance at an event in New York.  He reiterated the Hong Kong center's deliberate stance to stay away from local politics and to cover business and policy, education, arts and culture as an institution.  “At Asia Society, we generate not heat but light,” he said.

On August 4, 2017, Hong Kong international affairs commentator and newspaper columnist Simon Shen wrote in support of Asia Society Hong Kong's apolitical stance and described it as a “firewall” between international relations and local politics.  He pointed to the increasingly blinkered outlook of the local political discourse and argued for the need served by Asia Society to bring a broader perspective for understanding the role of Hong Kong in a global context.

See also 

 Japan Society (Manhattan)

References

Citations

Sources 
 Journal articles

  - Table of contents

External links 

 

Institutions founded by the Rockefeller family
Rockefeller Foundation
Non-profit organizations based in New York City
Park Avenue
Asian studies
Organizations established in 1956
Society museums in New York (state)
Asian art museums in New York (state)
Museums in Manhattan
Buildings and structures in Manhattan
Buildings and structures completed in 1981
International non-profit organizations
Art museums and galleries in New York City
Upper East Side
1956 establishments in New York (state)